Bjørnar Pettersen Holmvik (born 2 June 1985) is a Norwegian football coach and former player. As a player, Holmvik played as a defender and winger. He is currently head coach at Vidar.

He played for Stabæk from 2003 to 2008 and for SK Brann from 2009 to 2011.
SK Brann did not wish to renew Bjørnar Holmvik's contract and he went on to sign with newly promoted Tippeliga-club Sandnes Ulf. On 28 July he signed a contract with the Swedish club Kalmar.

In 2015, he joined Bryne. Seeing through his two-year contract, in 2017 he went on to third-tier club FK Vidar.

In July 2018, Holmvik returned to Sandnes Ulf. After the end of the 2019 season, Holmvik retired as player and became head coach of 3. divisjon club Vidar. After the 2020. 3. divisjon was cancelled because of the COVID-19 pandemic, Holmvik played his first Vidar match as a substitute in the second round of the 2021 Norwegian Football Cup.

Career statistics
Sources:

Honours

Norway
Eliteserien: 2008
Norwegian Football Cup: 2008 (runner-up)

References

1985 births
Living people
Footballers from Oslo
Norwegian footballers
Norway youth international footballers
Norway under-21 international footballers
Association football defenders
Stabæk Fotball players
SK Brann players
Sandnes Ulf players
Kalmar FF players
Fredrikstad FK players
Bryne FK players
FK Vidar players
Eliteserien players
Norwegian First Division players
Norwegian Second Division players
Allsvenskan players
Norwegian expatriate footballers
Norwegian expatriate sportspeople in Sweden
Expatriate footballers in Sweden
Norwegian football managers
FK Vidar managers